Mount Von Braun is a mountain (3,275 m) located 4 nautical miles (7 km) south of Mount Sabine in the Admiralty Mountains. Mapped by United States Geological Survey (USGS) from surveys and U.S. Navy air photos, 1960–63. Named by Advisory Committee on Antarctic Names (US-ACAN) for Wernher von Braun of the National Aeronautics and Space Administration, a visitor at McMurdo Station, 1966–67.

Mountains of Victoria Land
Borchgrevink Coast